Andy Chambers (born 20 October 1966) is an English author and game designer best known for his work on over 30 Games Workshop rulebooks and sourcebooks.

Personal life
In 2003, he married Jessica Chambers after they met at KublaCon 2002.

Career 
Chambers is best known for his work for Games Workshop, where he worked from March 1990 to March 2004. He worked extensively on various Warhammer 40,000 rulebooks and sourcebooks, and also authored multiple fiction novels set in the same universe. Chambers was the lead designer on a number of Warhammer 40,000 spin-off games, such as Necromunda (1995) and Battlefleet Gothic (1999), produced by Specialist Games. These games were released at a time of major growth for Games Workshop and "were designed with expansions and more miniatures sales in mind".

In 2003, Chambers joined Mongoose Publishing as the lead designer of the company's development team for the Starship Troopers tabletop miniatures game. Starship Troopers won "Best New Game" in the 2005 Origins Awards.

Chambers was the Lead Story Writer for Blizzard Entertainment, for StarCraft II: Wings of Liberty. According to Megan Farokhmanesh, "much of the groundwork on Wings of Liberty was done, but it was Andy Chambers who finished the title".

Between 2005 and 2018, Chambers wrote several books and novellas set in Warhammer 40,000 and the majority were about the Dark Eldar. Antony Jones, for SFBook in his review of Path of the Renegade (Dark Eldar Book 1), wrote "I loved how the author manages to elevate the Dark Eldar above that of humanity by describing games played with human captives as they watch them around a human size maze, the humans think they are really escaping but in reality being directed at every turn and watched over by their Eldar masters - very much like mice overlooked by people in white coats. [...] There aren't many novels that focus purely on the evil and even fewer that manage to pull it of effectively but Chambers does an excellent job here, it's one of the best examples I've read".

On 14 May 2012 Dust Warfare, written by Andy Chambers, was released by Fantasy Flight Games. In June 2013, Fantasy Flight Games announced that New Zealand-based Battlefront Miniatures would take over distribution of both Dust Warfare and Dust Tactics.

In 2015, Chambers became a Creative Director at Reforged Studios. Chambers, Tuomas Pirinen, and Ryan Miller created the skirmish board game Warforged: First Contact for Reforged Studios and Ninja Division Publishing who planned to bring it to market through a Kickstarter campaign. While the campaign beat its goal of $60,000, the campaign was cancelled before the Kickstarter ended. There has been no update on the game since April 2017.

Chambers and David Lewis received a nomination together in the 2017 Origins Awards "Miniatures" category for Dropfleet Commander by Hawk Wargames. In 2017, he created Blood Red Skies, an air combat miniature game, which was released by Warlord Games. He also created multiple expansions for the game between 2017 and 2019. Matt Jarvis, in a review of Blood Red Skies: Battle of Britain for Tabletop Gaming, wrote "abstracting altitude, position, damage levels and more into a single visual cue is a brilliant touch, making the slick ruleset effortless to execute and every battle look cinematic – closing in on a plane with its nose already pointed at the floor is an exciting moment, especially when combined with the simple but effective rules for tailing. [...] With a bit of tightening up, Blood Red Skies could be a strong contender for an involving tournament and spectator game – at the moment, it's just a little too loose for anything but casual play. [...] But you know what? None of that really mattered a smidge while I was actually playing Blood Red Skies, because I was just having such a fun time watching my squadrons zip through clouds, around anti-air defences and unleash bursts of machine-gun fire on enemy pilots who would similarly dance around, whizzing between the tips of wings to try and zero in". Chambers also designed Strontium Dogs, a skirmish game, which was released by Warlord Games in 2018.

In 2019, Chambers was a contributor to Frostgrave: The Wizard's Conclave. In his chapter “The Abandoned Workshop”, "warbands vie for control of powerful magical construct that is guarding a workshop full of potions. The conflict with the construct takes place in a confined space, with warbands trying to avoid attacks while gathering treasure".

Works

Board Games, Card Games and Miniature Games

Novels and Short Stories

Role Playing Games

Video Games

Magazines

References

External links

Andy Chambers' author profile page at the Black Library.
RPGGeek - RPG Designer Page: Andy Chambers 
BoardGameGeek - Board Game Designer Page: Andy Chambers

1966 births
21st-century British novelists
Blizzard Entertainment people
Board game designers
British male novelists
British video game designers
Living people
Role-playing game designers